The 1891 Spanish general election was held on Sunday, 1 February (for the Congress of Deputies) and on Sunday, 15 February 1891 (for the Senate), to elect the 5th Cortes of the Kingdom of Spain in the Restoration period. All 442 seats in the Congress of Deputies (plus four special districts) were up for election, as well as 180 of 360 seats in the Senate. Following a 1890 reform of the electoral law that saw a change from the previous censitary suffrage to a universal manhood suffrage, the electorate was extended to about 27.3% of the country's population.

The election saw a large parliamentary majority for the Conservative Party after Antonio Cánovas del Castillo's return to power in July 1890, following the end of the Liberal Party's "turn" of government between 1885 and 1890.

Overview

Electoral system
The Spanish Cortes were envisaged as "co-legislative bodies", based on a nearly perfect bicameral system. Both the Congress of Deputies and the Senate had legislative, control and budgetary functions, sharing equal powers except for laws on contributions or public credit, where the Congress had preeminence. Voting for the Cortes was on the basis of universal manhood suffrage, which comprised all national males over 25 years of age, having at least a two-year residency in a municipality and in full enjoyment of their civil rights. In Cuba and Puerto Rico voting was on the basis of censitary suffrage, comprising males of age fulfilling one of the following criteria: being taxpayers with a minimum quota of 125 Pt per territorial contribution (paid at least one year in advance) or per industrial or trade subsidy (paid at least two years in advance), having a particular position (royal academy numerary members; ecclesiastic individuals; active, unemployed or retired public employees; military personnel; widely recognized painters and sculptors; public teachers; etc.), or having at least a two-year residency in a municipality, provided that an educational or professional capacity could be proven.

For the Congress of Deputies, 107 seats were elected using a partial block voting system in 31 multi-member constituencies, with the remaining 335 being elected under a one-round first-past-the-post system in single-member districts. Candidates winning a plurality in each constituency were elected. In constituencies electing eight seats or more, electors could vote for no more than three candidates less than the number of seats to be allocated; in those with more than four seats and up to eight, for no more than two less; in those with more than one seat and up to four, for no more than one less; and for one candidate in single-member districts. The Congress was entitled to one member per each 50,000 inhabitants, with each multi-member constituency being allocated a fixed number of seats. Additionally, literary universities, economic societies of Friends of the Country and officially organized chambers of commerce, industry and agriculture were entitled to one seat per each 5,000 registered voters that they comprised, which resulted in four additional special districts for the 1891 election. The law also provided for by-elections to fill seats vacated throughout the legislature.

As a result of the aforementioned allocation, each Congress multi-member constituency was entitled the following seats:

For the Senate, 180 seats were indirectly elected by the local councils and major taxpayers, with electors voting for delegates instead of senators. Elected delegates—equivalent in number to one-sixth of the councillors in each local council—would then vote for senators using a write-in, two-round majority voting system. The provinces of Álava, Albacete, Ávila, Biscay, Cuenca, Guadalajara, Guipúzcoa, Huelva, Logroño, Matanzas, Palencia, Pinar del Río, Puerto Príncipe, Santa Clara, Santander, Santiago de Cuba, Segovia, Soria, Teruel, Valladolid and Zamora were allocated two seats each, whereas each of the remaining provinces was allocated three seats, for a total of 147. The remaining 33 were allocated to special districts comprising a number of institutions, electing one seat each—the archdioceses of Burgos, Granada, Santiago de Compostela, Santiago de Cuba, Seville, Tarragona, Toledo, Valencia, Valladolid and Zaragoza; the Royal Spanish Academy; the royal academies of History, Fine Arts of San Fernando, Exact and Natural Sciences, Moral and Political Sciences and Medicine; the universities of Madrid, Barcelona, Granada, Havana, Oviedo, Salamanca, Santiago, Seville, Valencia, Valladolid and Zaragoza; and the economic societies of Friends of the Country from Madrid, Barcelona, Havana–Puerto Rico, León, Seville and Valencia. An additional 180 seats comprised senators in their own right—the Monarch's offspring and the heir apparent once coming of age; Grandees of Spain of the first class; Captain Generals of the Army and the Navy Admiral; the Patriarch of the Indies and archbishops; and the presidents of the Council of State, the Supreme Court, the Court of Auditors, the Supreme War Council and the Supreme Council of the Navy, after two years of service—as well as senators for life (who were appointed by the Monarch).

Election date
The term of each chamber of the Cortes—the Congress and one-half of the elective part of the Senate—expired five years from the date of their previous election, unless they were dissolved earlier. The previous Congress and Senate elections were held on 4 and 25 April 1886, which meant that the legislature's terms would have expired on 4 and 25 April 1891, respectively. The monarch had the prerogative to dissolve both chambers at any given time—either jointly or separately—and call a snap election. There was no constitutional requirement for simultaneous elections for the Congress and the Senate, nor for the elective part of the Senate to be renewed in its entirety except in the case that a full dissolution was agreed by the monarch. Still, there was only one case of a separate election (for the Senate in 1877) and no half-Senate elections taking place under the 1876 Constitution.

The Cortes were officially dissolved on 29 December 1890, with the dissolution decree setting the election dates for 1 February (for the Congress) and 15 February 1891 (for the Senate) and scheduling for both chambers to convene on 2 March.

Background

The 1885–1890 Liberal Party government of Práxedes Mateo Sagasta (later to be known as the "Long Government" or "Long Parliament", in reference to it being only one during the Restoration period to last its full five year-term) had seen the introduction of many liberalizing reforms within the framework of the 1876 Constitution: the 1887 Associations Law allowed the formation of trade unions such as the General Union of Workers (UGT), as well as the celebration of associative congresses and meetings; the 1888 Jury Law, which had the consequence of favoring the freedom of press by ending prior censorship and taking the jurisdiction over crimes of slander or defamation away from the military; the 1889 Civil Code, which coupled with the Administrative Procedure Law and the 1888 Administrative Litigation Law (also dubed in Spanish as Ley Santamaría de Paredes) codified and structured the existing civil and administrative laws. Finally, the approval of a new electoral law in 1890 reinstated universal suffrage in Spain, definitely repealing censitary suffrage for all forthcoming elections and extending the franchise from about 5% of the population to nearly 25%. Other changes included a simplification of the electoral process as well as the removal of the system allowing deputies to be elected through cumulative voting.

Results

Congress of Deputies

Senate

Distribution by group

Notes

References

Bibliography

1891 elections in Spain
1891 in Spain
1891
February 1891 events